Karmic astrology as practiced by some astrologers who believe in reincarnation though the concepted they can read the person's karma in a Natal chart by studying in particular Lunar nodes and retrograde planets. Other astrologers, such as Dane Rudhyar's protégé Alexander Ruperti, have lectured that everything in the Natal Chart is karmic.

Description 

Both benevolent acts and selfishly motivated acts eventually come back to us as good and bad karma respectively. This could be in the same lifetime, or centuries down the line. Karmic astrology is the science of discerning as accurately as possible, through the positions of planets in your birth/divisional chart, the reasons why you are the way you are and why you behave as you do. 

It also provides you guidance to resolve past life situations so as to wipe your slate clean and make room for more positive karma in your current lifetime.

The Karmic planetary positions are divided into five parts:

Sun: The Planet Sun tells about your life’s purpose since it is a soul planet, so it will indicate about your weaknesses, fears, rational thinking etc

Your Karmic life purpose  weaknesses, fears

Moon: The Planet Moon symbolizes the memory of our Karmic Past, detailed analysis of the Moon will clear all your unresolved past issues.
 
Memories of your Karmic past - unresolved past life issues that have been re-simulated.

Saturn: In general context the planet Saturn is famous for creating troubles and issues but the Karmic substances says that the planet Saturn judges your Karma and provides fruits accordingly. 

But at times it will stand as a stumbling block as well.

Your Karmic Stumbling blocks

Rahu: Do you know that planet Rahu is the root cause of Karma and without Rahu one cannot perform Karma internally or externally?

Your Karmic roots

Ketu: You may be aware of the importance of planet Ketu which is called a spiritual planet, it is the planet which guides us about our Karmic Path and makes us follow positive path that leads you towards a beautiful and comfortable life.

Your Karmic Path

Apart from all this, actually Vedic Folks will analyze your birth chart, about your Karma or action and Karmic factors also, along with the 5th & 9th houses and their lords would also be analyzed for getting exact and transparent results.

Notes

Astrology